Toluca is a city in Marshall County, Illinois, United States. The population was 1,340 at the 2020 census. It is part of the Peoria, Illinois, Metropolitan Statistical Area.

Geography
Toluca is located in eastern Marshall County at  (41.003368, -89.133244). Illinois Route 117 passes through the city as Main Street and Santa Fe Avenue, leading north  to Illinois Route 17 and south  to Roanoke.

The North Branch of Crow Creek runs through the south side of the city, flowing west to Crow Creek and eventually the Illinois River.

History
Toluca was established in 1887 as a stop on the Atchison, Topeka, and Santa Fe Railway, on land owned by Marshall County native William Twist. In that year, local farmers led by Twist requested that the railroad make Toluca a regular stop. Their request was granted. With the backing of a Chicago firm, a grain elevator was built and maintained by Thomas Colehower of Long Point, Illinois. Colehower built the first house in the area of Toluca now called Old Town. In 1892, the Devlin Coal Company began mining coal at Toluca.

The population of Toluca increased, and by 1894 it was incorporated as a city. Its growth continued, fueled by immigrants from Poland, Italy, and Lithuania who came to work in the coal mines. In 1900, it had approximately 2,629 inhabitants. But by 1924, the coal mines were unprofitable and they closed down. The population shrank drastically as a result.

Miners from Toluca led a mob for the lynching of F. W. Stewart at Lacon on November 7, 1898.

Demographics

As of the census of 2000, there were 1,339 people, 581 households, and 343 families residing in the city. The racial makeup of the city was 94.13% White, 5.07% African American, 0.07% Native American, 0.37% Asian, 0.60% from other races, and 0.75% from two or more races. Hispanic or Latino of any race were 0% of the population.

There were 581 households, out of which 25.6% had children under the age of 18 living with them, 48.7% were married couples living together, 7.7% had a female householder with no husband present, and 40.8% were non-families. 35.3% of all households were made up of individuals, and 19.6% had someone living alone who was 65 years of age or older. The average household size was 2.16 and the average family size was 2.81.

In the city, the population was spread out, with 20.9% under the age of 18, 5.8% from 18 to 24, 25.5% from 25 to 44, 20.9% from 45 to 64, and 26.8% who were 65 years of age or older. The median age was 43 years. For every 100 females, there were 81.7 males. For every 100 females age 18 and over, there were 78.6 males.

The median income for a household in the city was $37,072, and the median income for a family was $45,956. Males had a median income of $31,964 versus $23,558 for females. The per capita income for the city was $20,243. About 4.8% of families and 6.5% of the population were below the poverty line, including 7.2% of those under age 18 and 5.6% of those age 65 or over.

Notable person

 Ernani Bernardi, big-band musician and member of the Los Angeles City Council, 1961–93

References

External links

Cities in Marshall County, Illinois
Cities in Illinois
Peoria metropolitan area, Illinois
Populated places established in 1887
1887 establishments in Illinois